Francheville was a former regional county municipality in the Mauricie region of Quebec, Canada.

The RCM was dissolved on December 31, 2001, when Saint-Étienne-des-Grès was transferred to the Maskinongé Regional County Municipality, the municipalities of Cap-de-la-Madeleine, Pointe-du-Lac, Saint-Louis-de-France, Sainte-Marthe-du-Cap, Trois-Rivières and Trois-Rivières-Ouest were merged into the new City of Trois-Rivières, and the remaining municipalities became part of the new Les Chenaux Regional County Municipality.

Although the division no longer functions as a regional county municipality in the political sense, the amalgamated city of Trois-Rivières and the regional county municipality of Les Chenaux are still grouped together as the census division of Francheville by Statistics Canada for census purposes. The division had a population of 143,267 in the Canada 2006 Census.

Subdivisions 
Prior to its dissolution, the RCM consisted of:

Villes
 Cap-de-la-Madeleine
 Saint-Louis-de-France
 Sainte-Marthe-du-Cap
 Trois-Rivières
 Trois-Rivières-Ouest

Municipalities
 Batiscan
 Champlain
 Pointe-du-Lac
 Saint-Luc-de-Vincennes
 Saint-Stanislas
 Sainte-Anne-de-la-Pérade

Parish municipalities
 Saint-Étienne-des-Grès
 Saint-Maurice
 Saint-Narcisse
 Saint-Prosper
 Sainte-Geneviève-de-Batiscan

See also 
 Municipal history of Quebec

References 

Former regional county municipalities in Quebec
Populated places disestablished in 2002